Leptothorax goesswaldi is a species of ant in the genus Leptothorax. It is found in France and Switzerland.

References

External links

goesswaldi
Hymenoptera of Europe
Insects described in 1967
Taxonomy articles created by Polbot
Taxobox binomials not recognized by IUCN